The Ministry of Legal and Parliamentary Affairs is the ministry in charge of transitional justice in Egypt.

Ministers
 Magdy Al-Agaty from September 2015.
 Omar Marwan from February 2017

See also

 Cabinet of Egypt

References

External links
Egypt's Cabinet Database

Transitional Justice and National Reconciliation
Egypt, Transitional Justice and National Reconciliation
Parliamentary affairs ministries